Papyrus 3, designated by  (in the numbering Gregory-Aland), is a small fragment of fifteen verses from the Gospel of Luke dating to the 6th/7th century. It is formed part of a lectionary. It is dated palaeographically to the 6th or 7th century.

The Greek text-type of this codex is a mixed. Aland placed it in Category III.

Text

Luke 7:36

 ΑΓΓ . . ΙΟ
 ΤΟΝ Κ ̣̅ ΗΣου
 ΤΟΝ̣Τ̣Ω̣ΝΦΣΡΙΣ̣
 Ε̣Λ̣ΘΩΝΕ̣ΙΣΤ̣
 ΙΕΙΔΟΥΓΥΝΗΗΤΙΣΗ
 ΓΝΟΥΣΑΟΤΙ̣ΚΑΤΑΚ
 ΣΑΑΛΑΒΑΣΤΡΟΝΜΥΡ̣
 Ο̣ΔΑΣΑΥΤΟΥΚΛΑΣΙΟΥΣ̣
 ΥΣΠΟΔΑΣΑΥΤΟΥ ΚΑΙ
 ΕΞΕΜΑΞΕΝΚΑΙΚΑΤΕ
 ΗΛΙΦΕΝ ΤΩΜΥΡΩ
 ΑΣΑΥΤΟΝΕΙΠΕΝΕ . . . . ΤΩ
 ΗΣΕΓΙΓΝΩΣΚΕΝΑΝΤ̣ΙΣΚΑΙΠΟΤΑΠ
 ΤΑΙΑΥΤΟΥΟΤΙΑ.ΑΡΤΩΛΟ̣ΣΕΣΤΙΝ
 ΕΙΠΕΝ Ο ΙΣΠΡΟΣ̣Α.Τ̣Ο̣Ν̣ΣΙΜΩΝ
 ΔΕΔΕΔΑ . . . ΛΕΕΙ̣ΠΕΝΦΗΣΙΝΔΥΟ
 ΤΙΝΙΟΕΙΣΩ
 Η̣ΚΟΝ̣ΤΑΜΗ̣
 ΤΟΤΙΣΟΥ
 ΔΕΣΙΜΩ̣
 Π̣ΕΝΑΥΤΩ̣
 Ω̣Σ̣Ι̣ΜΩ

Luke 10:38

 ΝΤΟΥΑΓΙΟυΛΟυΚΑ
 . . . . . . ΚΩΜΗ̣
 ΡΕΥΕΣΘΑΙΑΥΤΟΥ
 ΘΕΝΕΙΣΚΩΜΗΝΤΙΝ

History

The text of the manuscript was published by Karl Wessely in 1882.

The manuscript is housed at the Austrian National Library (Pap. G. 2323).

See also
 Luke 7, Luke 10
 List of New Testament papyri

References

Further reading

 Karl Wessely, Evangelien-Fragmente auf Papyrus, Wiener Studien 4 (1882), 198–214.

External links 
 New Testament Transcripts
 
 Digital image of P3 at CSNTM

New Testament papyri
6th-century biblical manuscripts
Biblical manuscripts of the Austrian National Library
Gospel of Luke papyri